ABC are the first three letters of the Latin script known as the alphabet.

ABC or abc may also refer to:

Arts, entertainment, and media

Broadcasting

 American Broadcasting Company, a commercial U.S. TV broadcaster
 Disney–ABC Television Group, the former name of the parent organization of ABC
 Australian Broadcasting Corporation, one of the national publicly funded broadcasters of Australia
ABC Television (Australian TV network), the national television network of the Australian Broadcasting Corporation
ABC TV (Australian TV channel), the flagship TV station of the Australian Broadcasting Corporation
ABC Canberra (TV station), Canberra, and other ABC TV local stations in state capitals
ABC Australia (Southeast Asian TV channel), an international pay TV channel
 ABC Radio (disambiguation), various radio stations including the American and Australian ABCs
 Associated Broadcasting Corporation, one of the former names of TV5 Network, Inc., a Philippine television company
 ABC-5, the former name of TV5 (Philippines), a Philippine free-to-air network
 ABC (Swedish TV programme), a former Swedish regional news programme
 ABC Weekend TV, a former British television company
 Asahi Broadcasting Corporation, a Japanese commercial television and radio station
 Associated Broadcasting Company, a former name of Associated Television, a British television company

Music

Albums 
 ABC (Jin album), a 2007 album by rapper MC Jin
 ABC (Kreidler album), a 2014 album by Kreidler
 ABC (The Jackson 5 album), a 1970 album by The Jackson 5

Groups
 A.B.C., the former name of Japanese boy band A.B.C-Z
 ABC (band), an English pop band
 Acid Black Cherry, a Japanese rock band
 Alien Beat Club, a Danish pop and R&B band
 Another Bad Creation, an American hip hop and new jack swing group

Labels
 ABC Classics, an Australian record label
 ABC Records, an American record label

Other uses in music
 ABC song (disambiguation), various songs with this title
 ABC notation, a musical notation language
 O2 ABC Glasgow, a music venue

Periodicals
 ABC (magazine), an Italian magazine published between 1960 and 1977
 ABC (newspaper), a Spanish daily newspaper founded in 1903
ABC (Monterrey newspaper), a Mexican newspaper founded in 1985
 ABC Color, a Paraguayan newspaper founded in 1967

Other uses in arts, entertainment, and media
 ABC Cinemas, a UK cinema chain
 Alphabet book, any of several children's books depicting the alphabet
 America's Best Comics, an imprint of DC Comics

Brands and enterprises

Companies

Financial 
 Agricultural Bank of China, a bank in the People's Republic of China
 Arab Banking Corporation, an international bank headquartered in Bahrain

Food and beverage 
 ABC (food), an Indonesian-based food division of the H. J. Heinz Company
 Aerated Bread Company, a British bakery and tea-room chain
 Appalachian Brewing Company, an American brewery

Transport 
 ABC (1906 automobile), an American car
 ABC (1920 automobile), an English car
 ABC (1922 automobile), a planned American car
 ABC Motors, an English manufacturer of aircraft, aero engines and cars
 ABC Rail Guide, British railway guide published between 1853 and 2007
 ABC motorcycles, a British motorcycle manufacturer

Other companies
 ABC Learning, a former Australian childcare business
 ABC Stores, a chain of convenience stores in Hawaii
 Aircraft Builders Council, a provider of aviation products liability insurance
 Anglo Belgian Corporation, a diesel engine manufacturer
 Audit Bureau of Circulations (disambiguation), publication circulation auditing companies
 Audit Bureau of Circulations (India), a non-profit circulation-auditing organisation
 Audit Bureau of Circulations, former name for the North American non-profit industry organization Alliance for Audited Media
 Audit Bureau of Circulations (UK), a non-profit organisation

Mathematics 
 ABC formula
 Approximate Bayesian computation, a family of statistical techniques
 abc conjecture, a concept in number theory

Organizations

Political organizations and unions
 ABC (Cuba), Cuban political organization 1931–1952, named after the system for labeling its clandestine cells
 All Basotho Convention, a political party in Lesotho
 Alliance for Barangay Concerns, a political party in the Philippines
 American Bakery and Confectionery Workers' International Union, a predecessor to the contemporary Bakery, Confectionery, Tobacco Workers and Grain Millers' International Union
 Americans Battling Communism, an anti-communist organization founded in 1947
 Anarchist Black Cross, an anarchist support organization
 Anything But Conservative, a 2008 Canadian political campaign
 Association of Barangay Captains, former name for an organization of all the barangays (villages) in the Philippines, now known as the League of Barangays in the Philippines
 Association of British Counties, a non-party-political society

Religious organizations
 American Baptist Convention, former name of American Baptist Churches USA
 Association of Baptist Churches in Ireland, in Ireland and the United Kingdom

Sports organizations
 ABC Futebol Clube, a football (soccer) club based in Natal, Rio Grande do Norte, Brazil
 American Bowling Congress, which merged in 2005 with other bowling organizations to form the United States Bowling Congress
 Association of Boxing Commissions, a North American not-for-profit professional boxing and mixed martial arts organization
 Indianapolis ABCs, a 1900s Negro league baseball team

Other organizations
 Academia Británica Cuscatleca, a school in Santa Tecla, El Salvador
 Accessible Books Consortium, a subunit of the World Intellectual Property Organization
 Afrikan Black Coalition, a University of California student organization
 American Bird Conservancy, a non-profit membership organization
 Association of Black Cardiologists, a North American non-profit
 Australian Bird Count, a project of the Royal Australasian Ornithologists Union
 Virginia Alcoholic Beverage Control Authority, public safety agency

Places
 ABC countries, Argentina, Brazil, and Chile
 ABC Islands (Alaska), Admiralty Island, Baranof Island, and Chichagof Island
 ABC islands (Leeward Antilles), Aruba, Bonaire, and Curaçao
 ABC Region, an industrial area outside of São Paulo, Brazil
 Albacete Airport, a joint civilian/military airport serving Albacete, Spain (IATA: ABC)
 Altnabreac railway station, Scotland, by National Rail code
 Appa Balwant Chowk, area of Pune, India, noted for its bookshops

Science and technology

Biology and medicine
 Abacavir, an antiretroviral drug used to treat HIV/AIDS
 ABC (medicine), a mnemonic for "Airway, Breathing, Circulation"
 ABC model of flower development, a genetic model
 Abortion–breast cancer hypothesis, a posited connection between breast cancer and abortion
 Alien Big Cat, large feline outside its indigenous range
 Aneurysmal bone cyst, a kind of lesion
 ATP-binding cassette transporter, a transmembrane protein

Computing

Hardware
 ABC, a line of computers by Dataindustrier AB
 Acorn Business Computer, a series of microcomputers announced at the end of 1983 by the British company Acorn Computers
 Atanasoff–Berry computer, an early electronic digital computer

File formats

Other uses in computing
 ABC (computer virus), a memory-resident, file-infecting computer virus
 ABC (programming language), a programming language and environment
 ABC (stream cipher), a stream cipher algorithm
 Abstract base class, a programming language concept
 Artificial bee colony algorithm, a search algorithm

Economics
ABC analysis, an inventory categorization technique
Activity-based costing, an accounting method
Assignment for the benefit of creditors, a concept in bankruptcy law

Psychology 
ABC data collection, a descriptive functional behavior assessment method in applied behavior analysis
 Affective-behavioral-cognitive model, an attitude component model

Transportation
 Active Body Control, a type of automobile suspension technology
 Automatic Buffer Couplers, a type of railway couplers

Other uses in science and technology
 ABC dry chemical, a fire extinguishing agent
 ABC weapon, a weapon of mass destruction
 Accelerated bridge construction, a technique for building bridges
 Aerial bundled cable, for power lines
 Airborne Cigar, a British military electronic countermeasure system used during World War II (WWII) to jam Luftwaffe night fighter communications
 Atomic, biological, and chemical defense, now rendered as chemical, biological, radiological and nuclear defense

Other uses
 ABC strategy, for "abstinence, be faithful, use a condom", a sex-education strategy
 ABC trial of Crispin Aubrey, John Berry and Duncan Campbell in 1978 in the United Kingdom
 Advance Booking Charter, a type of air travel
 Air batu campur, also known as ais kacang, a Malaysian dessert
 American-born Chinese, people of Chinese ethnicity born in the United States
 Andrew Cunningham, 1st Viscount Cunningham of Hyndhope (1883–1963), nicknamed ABC, British WWII admiral
 Architectural, building and construction, an industry; for example, see Industry Foundation Classes
 Australian-born Chinese, people of Chinese ethnicity born in Australia

See also
 .abc (disambiguation)
 Alcoholic Beverage Control (disambiguation)